St Bride's Minor is a community in Bridgend County Borough, south Wales. Located north of Bridgend town it is made up of Sarn, a large housing estate, and the villages of Bryncethin and Abergarw. The southern border of the community is defined by the M4 motorway, though the community stretches briefly beyond the Motorway to take in the McArthurGlen Designer Outlet. The eastern, and largest area of the community consists of farmland and small scattered farm houses. At the 2001 census, the community's population was 5,575, increasing to 6,014 at the 2011 Census.

At the local level St Bride's Minor is governed by St Bride's Minor Community Council, electing up to thirteen community councillors.

At the 1995 council elections St Bride's Minor was also a ward to Bridgend County Borough Council electing two Labour Party county councillors. Prior to 1995 St Bride's Minor was an electoral ward to Mid Glamorgan County Council and Ogwr Borough Council.

Notes

External links
Map showing the community boundaries of St Bride's Minor

Bridgend
Communities in Bridgend County Borough
Former wards of Bridgend County Borough
Mid Glamorgan electoral wards